Nebria rubripes rousseleti is a subspecies of ground beetle in the  Nebriinae subfamily that is endemic to France.

References

rubripes rousseleti
Beetles described in 1988
Endemic beetles of Metropolitan France